Pride of India or Pride-of-India is a common name for several plants and may refer to:
 Koelreuteria paniculata - Also known as goldenrain tree or China tree
 Lagerstroemia speciosa - Also known as Lagerstroemia crape myrtle, crape myrtle, crepe myrtle, crapemyrtle, crepemyrtle, giant crape-myrtle, Queen's crape-myrtle or banabá plant
 Melia azedarach - Also known as  chinaberry, Persian lilac, white cedar, Texas umbrella, bead-tree, Cape lilac, Ceylon cedar,  bead-tree or Cape lilac

References